The Roommates is a 1973 American thriller film directed by Arthur Marks, starring Pat Woodell, Marki Bey, Roberta Collins, Laurie Rose, and Christina Hart.

Plot
Five young women named Beth, Brea, Carla, Heather, and Heather's cousin Paula take their summer vacation together at a resort on Lake Arrowhead, where they go to parties and become involved with local men. However, things go haywire for the women when a mysterious killer targets them.

Cast

Marki Bey as Carla
Pat Woodell as Heather
Roberta Collins as Beth
Laurie Rose as Brea
David Moses as Mike
Ken Scott as Marty
Kipp Whitman as Don
Christina Hart as Paula
Gary Warren Mascaro as Arnie
David Ankrum as Andy
Al Cole as Joe
John Durren as Socks
John Morgan Evans as Warren
Dexter Freeman as Larry
Barbara Fuller as Sylvia
John Hart as Sam (Sheriff)
Greg Mabrey as Harold
Richard Mansfield as Mickey
Peter Oliphant as Aaron
Ben Pfeiffer as Lee
Darl Severns as Nick
Paula Shaw as Socks' Ex-Girlfriend
Pam Stroud as Diane
Connie Strickland as Alice

Production
The Roommates was filmed in and around Lake Arrowhead in the San Bernardino Mountains of San Bernardino County, California, where the story takes place.

References

External links
The Roommates at IMDb
Review of film at Film Monthly
Review of film at Temple of Schlock

1973 films
1970s crime thriller films
1970s exploitation films
American crime thriller films
American exploitation films
Films about summer camps
Films directed by Arthur Marks
Films set in California
1970s English-language films
1970s American films